The 2007–08 season is Hyderabad cricket team's 74th competitive season. The Hyderabad cricket team is senior men's domestic cricket team based in the city of Hyderabad, India, run by the Hyderabad Cricket Association. They represent the region of Telangana in the state of Andhra Pradesh in domestic competitions.

Background
In the beginning of the season, seven Ranji players signed up to play in Indian Cricket League (ICL), a private cricket league funded by Zee Entertainment Enterprises but not approved by Board of Control for Cricket in India (BCCI). Earlier, BCCI said that the players signed with ICL will be banned for life from playing in India and also barred the ICL players from taking part in all domestic tournaments which led to the exclusion of ICL players from Hyderabad squad. The list include former India U-19 captain, Ambati Rayudu. The others were Devishetty Vinay Kumar, Ibrahim Khaleel, Anirudh Singh, Shashank Nag, Inder Shekar Reddy and Kaushik Reddy. The luring of domestic players by ICL also led BCCI to counter the rebel T20 league by starting their own franchise-based T20 competition called Indian Premier League whose first season was slated to start in April 2008.

Competition Overview

Squads
 Head Coach : Vivek Jaisimha
 Bowling Coach : Kanwaljit Singh

 Irani Cup
Arjun Yadav and Ojha got selected to the Rest of India squad for the 2007 Irani Cup, a first-class cricket competition in India.

NKP Salve Challenger Trophy
Ojha got picked to the India Red squad while Arjun Yadav got picked to the India Blue squad for the 2007-08 NKP Salve Challenger Trophy, a List-A cricket tournament in India.

Duleep Trophy
Ojha, Ravi Teja and Arjun Yadav got selected to the South Zone squad for the 2007-08 Duleep Trophy, a first-class cricket tournament in India.

Deodhar Trophy
Laxman, Ojha, Sarvesh and Arjun Yadav got selected to the South Zone squad for the 2007-08 Deodhar Trophy, a List-A cricket competition in India.

Indian Premier League
The local franchise, Deccan Chargers signed Laxman from the auction and picked Ojha, Ravi Teja, Sarvesh and Arjun Yadav for their uncapped Indians players for the newly formed Indian Premier League, a professional Twenty20 cricket league in India, in its inaugural season.

Ranji Trophy

The Hyderabad team, led by V. V. S. Laxman, began their campaign in the Ranji Trophy, the premier first-class cricket tournament in India, with a draw against the Bengal at Kolkata on 4 November 2007. Pragyan Ojha led the team after two matches in the absence of Laxman as he was selected for the Pakistan tour of India and the India tour of Australia. They finished sixth in Group B of the Super League and failed to advance to the knockout stage with one win, two losses and three draws.

Points Table
Super League Group B

  Top two teams advanced to the knockout stage.
  Bottom team relegated to the Plate League for the 2008–09 Ranji Trophy.
 Points system : Win by an innings or 10 wickets = 6, Win = 5, Draw with first innings lead = 3, Draw with first innings deficit = 1, No Result = 1, Loss = 0.

Matches
Group Stage

Statistics
Most runs

 Source: Cricinfo
Most wickets

 Source: Cricinfo

Vijay Hazare Trophy
The Hyderabad team, led by Arjun Yadav, began their campaign in the Vijay Hazare Trophy, previously known as the Ranji One-Day Trophy, a List-A cricket tournament in India, with a loss against the Kerala at Chennai on 26 February 2008. Sarvesh Kumar's five wicket haul helped the Hyderabad to bowl out Kerala for 237 but the disciplined bowling effort from the Kerala ensured their win by 7 runs despite the half-century from Abhinav Kumar for the Hyderabad. The Hyderabad lost their second match to the Karnataka as Bharat Chipli's century and Vinay Kumar's all-round contribution with both bat and ball ensured a 111 run for the Karnataka. The Hyderabad suffered their third loss in as many games as three-wicket haul from Ravichandran Ashwin and C. Ganapathy helped the Tamil Nadu restrict the Hyderabad for 236 despite Abhinav Kumar's 93 while century from Murali Vijay ensured the Tamil Nadu a two-wicket win. The Hyderabad finally earned their first win in the tournament with a 62-run win over the Goa as Anoop Pai's maiden List-A century along with the half-century from Arjun Yadav helped the Hyderabad post 284 while Dwaraka Ravi Teja and Mohammed Shakeer shared seven wickets between them to bowl out Goa for 222 despite the half-century from Ajay Ratra. A century from Abhinav Kumar and three-wicket haul from Ravi Teja ensured the Hyderabad win over the Andhra by 95 runs though they finished third in the South Zone and failed to qualify for the knockout stage with two wins and three losses.

Points Table
South Zone

Matches
Zonal Stage

Statistics
Most runs

 Source: Cricinfo
Most wickets

 Source: Cricinfo

See also
 Hyderabad cricket team
 Hyderabad Cricket Association

References

External links
Hyderabad cricket team official site

Cricket in Hyderabad, India
Cricket in Telangana
Sport in Telangana